The 2002 Saskatchewan Roughriders finished in 4th place in the West Division with an 8–10–0–2 record in the final season where overtime losses counted in the standings. They crossed over to the East Division and played against the Toronto Argonauts and lost in the East Semi-Final 24–14. It was the first time they had made the playoffs since their Grey Cup run in 1997.

Offseason

CFL draft

Preseason

Regular season

Season standings

Season schedule

Roster

Awards and records
CFL's Special Teams Player of the Year – Corey Holmes

CFL All-Star Selections
Derick Armstrong, Receiver
Corey Holmes, Special Teams
Omarr Morgan, Cornerback

Western All-Star Selections
Derick Armstrong, Receiver
Corey Holmes, Special Teams
Omarr Morgan, Cornerback

Milestones

Playoffs

East Semi-Final

References

Saskatchewan Roughriders
Saskatchewan Roughriders seasons
Saskatchewan Roughriders Season, 2002